Sir Godfrey Kneller, 1st Baronet (born Gottfried Kniller; 8 August 1646 – 19 October 1723), was the leading portrait painter in England during the late 17th and early 18th centuries, and was court painter to English and British monarchs from Charles II to George I.  His major works include The Chinese Convert (1687; Royal Collection, London); a series of four portraits of Isaac Newton painted at various junctures of the latter's life; a series of ten reigning European monarchs, including King Louis XIV of France; over 40 "kit-cat portraits" of members of the Kit-Cat Club; and ten "beauties" of the court of William III, to match a similar series of ten of Charles II's mistresses painted by Kneller's predecessor as court painter, Sir Peter Lely.

Early life 

Kneller was born Gottfried Kniller in the Free City of Lübeck, the son of Zacharias Kniller, a portrait painter. Kneller studied in Leiden, but became a pupil of Ferdinand Bol and Rembrandt Harmenszoon van Rijn in Amsterdam. He then travelled with his brother John Zacharias Kneller, who was an ornamental painter, to Rome and Venice in the early 1670s, painting historical subjects and portraits in the studio of Carlo Maratti, and later moved to Hamburg.

Career 

The brothers came to England in 1676, and won the patronage of the Duke of Monmouth. He was introduced to, and painted a portrait of, Charles II. 

In England, Kneller concentrated almost entirely on portraiture. In the spirit of enterprise, he founded a studio which churned out portraits on an almost industrial scale, relying on a brief sketch of the face with details added to a formulaic model, aided by the fashion for gentlemen to wear full wigs. His portraits set a pattern that was followed until William Hogarth and Joshua Reynolds.

Nevertheless, he established himself as a leading portrait artist in England.  When Sir Peter Lely died in 1680, Kneller was appointed Principal Painter in Ordinary to the Crown by Charles II. 

For about 20 years (c. 1682–1702) he lived at No. 16-17 The Great Piazza, Covent Garden. 

In the 1690s, Kneller painted the Hampton Court Beauties depicting the most glamorous ladies-in-waiting of the Royal Court for which he received, in 1692, his knighthood from William III. In 1695, he received, in the presence of the king, an honorary Doctorate of Law from the University of Oxford. In 1700, he was created a Knight of the Holy Roman Empire by Emperor Leopold I. He produced a series of "Kit-cat" portraits of 48 leading politicians and men of letters, members of the Kit-Cat Club.

Created a baronet by King George I on 24 May 1715, he was also head of the Kneller Academy of Painting and Drawing from 1711 until 1716 in Great Queen Street, London, which counted such artists as Thomas Gibson amongst its founding directors.  His paintings were praised by Whig members including John Dryden, Joseph Addison, Richard Steele, and Alexander Pope.

On the landing in Horsham Museum in West Sussex hang works of art from the Museum's extensive painting collection, featuring a large 18th-century portrait of Charles Eversfield and his wife, of Denne Park House.

Personal life 
He married a widow, Susanna Grave, on 23 January 1704 at St Bride's Church, London. She was the daughter of the Reverend John Cawley, Archdeacon of Lincoln and Rector of Henley-on-Thames, and the granddaughter of regicide William Cawley. The couple had no children.

Death 
Kneller died of fever in 1723 at Great Queen Street and his remains were interred at Twickenham. He had been a churchwarden at St Mary's, Twickenham, when the 14th-century nave collapsed in 1713 and was active in the plans for the church's reconstruction by John James. His widow was buried at Twickenham on 11 December 1729.

Legacy 
A memorial was erected in Westminster Abbey. Kneller's will gave a pension of £100 a year to his assistant Edward Byng and entrusted Byng with seeing that all unfinished work was completed. Byng also inherited the drawings in Kneller's studio. Kneller and his wife had no children together. Most of his fortune was inherited by his grandson, Godfrey Kneller Huckle, who was the son of Agnes Huckle, Kneller's illegitimate daughter by Mrs Voss, and who took his grandfather's surname (Kneller) as a condition of his inheritance.

The site of the house Kneller built in 1709 in Whitton, near Twickenham, became occupied by the mid-19th century Kneller Hall, home of the Royal Military School of Music.

Character

Works 
In his hometown Lübeck there are works to be seen in the St. Annen Museum and in Saint Catherine Church. His former works at St. Mary's Church were destroyed by the Bombing of Lübeck 1942.  A large oil portrait (84" x 55") of James VII of Scotland (King James II of England) hangs on the main staircase of private members' Club, The Caledonian Club, in Belgravia, London.

A portrait of Queen Anne that belongs to Trinity Hospital in Retford, Nottinghamshire has been attributed to Kneller by the auctioneers Phillips – though it is unsigned. The hospital has a strong connection with Queen Anne, the founder being a first cousin of her grandmother. The portrait was restored and cleaned in 1999.

See also 
 English school of painting
 Kneller Hall

References 
Notes

Sources
  Godfried & Johan Zacharias Kneller biography in De groote schouburgh der Nederlantsche konstschilders en schilderessen (1718) by Arnold Houbraken, courtesy of the Digital library for Dutch literature

Further reading 
Primary studies
Adapted from a following source: 
 
 
 
 
 
Reference books

External links 

 

 
 A portrait of engraved by William Henry Mote for Fisher's Drawing Room Scrap Book, 1838 with a poetical illustration by Letitia Elizabeth Landon.
 King Charles II (1685) at the Walker Art Gallery, Liverpool
 Artcyclopedia: Sir Godfrey Kneller
 Biography
 Godfrey Kneller at PubHist
 Portraits by Kneller  at the National Portrait Gallery
 Self-portrait  at the National Portrait Gallery
 Horsham Museum

1646 births
1723 deaths
17th-century English painters
English male painters
18th-century English painters
17th-century German painters
German male painters
18th-century German painters
18th-century German male artists
Baronets in the Baronetage of Great Britain
British Baroque painters
Principal Painters in Ordinary
Knights Bachelor
German Baroque painters
Artists from Lübeck
German emigrants to England
Pupils of Carlo Maratta
Members of the Kit-Kat Club
Churchwardens
Pupils of Rembrandt
German expatriates in the Dutch Republic
Burials at St Mary's Church, Twickenham
18th-century English male artists
Naturalised citizens of the United Kingdom